The Danish Church in Southern Schleswig is an evangelical Lutheran church in Southern Schleswig in Northern Germany.

The church was founded by the Danish minority of Southern Schleswig and is affiliated with the Danish Church Abroad and the Church of Denmark. Though the church operates independently, it is overseen by the bishop of the Diocese of Haderslev. As such, it shares many of the  Church of Denmark's liberal views, including its support for the ordination of women and of remarriage after divorce.

Today, the church has nearly 30 congregations across Southern Schleswig and approximately 6,000 registered members who are serviced at 62 individual places of warship. The central church is the Church of the Holy Spirit (Danish: Helligåndskirken) in Flensburg.

History 
Following the reformation, many pastors in Southern Schleswig performed services in Danish, though certain parts of the ceremony had to be performed in German by mandate of the German Church. In 1905, the "Church Society of Flensburg and the Surrounding Area" (Danish: Kirkeligt Samfund for Flensborg og Omegn) was established with the purpose of reaching congregations within the German Church whose primary language was Danish. The society was rejected by officials who felt the Danish minority should conform to German society and its language.

In 1921, following the 1920 Schleswig plebiscites, the Danish Church in Flensburg (Danish: Den Danske Menighed i Flensborg) was established as a free church. In the following years the church expanded to include the whole of Southern Schleswig, and in 1959 it was given its current name.

Provosts 
 Anton Westergaard-Jacobsen, 1950–1962
 Hans Kvist, 1962–1969
 Ingemann Christensen, 1970–1979
 Christian Benjamin Karstoft, 1979–1993
 Viggo Jacobsen, 1993–2018
 Hasse Neldeberg Jørgensen, 2019–present

Churches 
Incomplete list of churches within the Danish Church in Southern Schleswig:

 Ansgar Church
 Church of the Holy Spirit (Helligåndskirken)
 Haderslev Danish Church
 Husum Danish Church
 Jaruplund Danish Church
 Lyksborg Danish Church
 St. Hans Church
 St. Jørgen Church
 Tarp Danish Church
 Westerland Danish Church

Sources

External links 

 Danish Church in Southern Schleswig (Danish)
 Danish Church Abroad (Danish)

Christianity in Schleswig-Holstein
Lutheranism in Germany
Lutheran churches in Schleswig-Holstein
Church of Denmark